Portrait of Lady Roxanda (Romanian: Doamna Roxanda) is a painting by Dobromir. Dobromir and his students finished the painting for the Curtea de Argeș Cathedral, in about 1526.

Description 
The picture measures 223 x 87.9 centimeters. The  mural is stored the National Museum of Art of Romania, in Bucharest.

In 1882, French restorers decided to dismantle the original work into 35 fragments - about 1/10 from the original amount: 29 are in the National Museum of Art of Romania, and National Museum of Romanian History, 4 belong to churches.

Analysis 
Lady Roxandra was a princess, the youngest daughter of Neagoe Basarab, who was the ruler of Wallachia between 1512 and 1521, and his consort Milica Despina. Roxandra is shown standing, holding a model of the monastery of Curtea de Arges, Wallachia's main church of the 16th century, the tomb of Romania's kings. On her head is a large crown.

References

External links 
 https://web.archive.org/web/20151208201635/http://www.muzeulgolesti.ro/pdf/volIII_Muzeu.pdf Vol. III (L-R)]; Muzeul Județean Argeș; Pitești; 2012; p. 63
 Muzeul Național de Istorie a României — București; Tablou votiv al lui Radu cel Mare; europeana.cimec.ro
 Vasile Drăguț: Dicționar enciclopedic de artă medievală românească, București 2000, p. 166—169

Fresco paintings in Romania